Bülent Ersoy (born 9 June 1952) is a Turkish singer and actress. She is known as one of the most popular singers of Turkish music, nicknamed Diva by her fans. Ersoy has many famous hits such as "Ümit Hırsızı" (Hope Thief), "Geceler" (Nights), "Beddua" (Curse), "Maazallah" (God Forbid), "Biz Ayrılamayız" (We Cannot Break Up), and "Sefam olsun" (I Enjoy Myself). Ersoy has published more than thirty albums so far and has made a name for herself in Turkish music history.

Biography

1952–1973: Early life 
Bülent Ersoy was born in 1952 in Malatya. For the purposes of performance, Bülent changed her surname from Erkoç (brave ram) to Ersoy (brave lineage) following Müjdat Gezen's recommendation. Ersoy began her career as a male singer, in the genre of Turkish classical music, and became an actor early on. Her grandparents played classical Turkish music and she first took private lessons and then studied at Istanbul Municipal Conservatory. Already one of Turkey's most popular singers and actors, she gained international notoriety in April 1981 after having sex reassignment surgery in London by a British plastic surgeon. She kept the name "Bülent" even though it is a typically masculine name.

Stage prohibition and restriction period 

After the operation, Ersoy found herself in opposition to 1980 Turkish coup d'état of Kenan Evren. In a crackdown on "social deviance," Ersoy's public performances were banned along with those of other transgender people. To circumvent the ban, she petitioned the Turkish courts to legally recognize her as a woman. The petition was rejected in January 1982. Days later, she attempted suicide. In 1983, she left Turkey in protest of the Evren regime's repressive policies and continued her career in Germany. Along with her musical career, she made several Turkish movies in Germany. Later on in the decade in 1989 Evren left office and many of his policies were rescinded.

2011–12: Aşktan Sabıkalı 

In late 2010, Ersoy announced that she had listened to nearly 1,500 songs in the last 2 years and found it difficult to choose the best songs for the album. Her new album Aşktan Sabıkalı (Love Convict), was released on 3 October 2011. The album includes a song written by Can Tanrıyar called "Alışmak İstemiyorum" (I Don't Wanna Get Used to It), and a classic by Orhan Gencebay: "Bir Teselli Ver", (Give Me Solace). There also is a song by Gülşen titled "Aşktan Sabıkalı", after which the album is named. Another piece in the album is a duet sung with Tarkan, titled "Bir Ben Bir Allah Biliyor" (Only I and Allah know ), which was popular as it was performed by two of Turkey's leading artists. On 22 December, Ersoy released a music video for the song, nearly three months after it was first played on the radio.

2013 onwards
In her appearances on TRT in 2013, Ersoy was keen to stress that her pop-arabesque songs were only a 'vice' to earn an income and classical music, which she received her University education in, is where her true allegiance and support lies. Although her last album was released in 2011, her last album where she sang classical and Alaturka (Turkish style) songs was in Alaturka 2000, after which she hasn't produced any material covering Alaturka or Classical material.

In late 2015, Ersoy stated in a press conference how Orhan Gencebay had mentioned to her that no one prominent had been producing Alaturka for the last couple of years. She stated that it was their mutual plan to 'get together' and think about what to for an album in this area. In early 2016, Ersoy said that she had listened to hundreds of songs and wasn't satisfied with what was brought to her (this being songs in the Pop/Arabesque genre). Although it's unclear as to when her next production will be, Ersoy seems to have returned from her semi-retired status and is producing new material. She announced that she would publish a new song written by Tarkan, named "Ümit Hırsızı", which was released in March 2019

Controversies

The case filed by Deniz Baykal
In a magazine program in 2005, Ersoy talked about her attempts to end her stage ban, and added: "During the period after the 1980 coup, a person who is now a party leader asked me for fortune to remove my stage ban." Following this statement, DYP leader Mehmet Ağar said that he was not the leader in question. As a result, the eyes turned to the CHP leader Deniz Baykal.

Baykal emphasized that at that time he was a lawyer and Bülent Ersoy had telephoned to consult him and later met him in person for only 2 minutes. He also added that nothing related to money and fortunes was discussed between the two. In response, Ersoy held a press conference. She claimed that she had met with Deniz Baykal personally in an office behind Dedeman Hotel in Ankara and added: "Mr. Deniz even had a gray suit on [during the meeting]. If I remember such details, I can remember you wanted 100 million back then, which is equal to 1 trillion today." She also claimed that the person who mediated the meeting was Mehmet Nabi, the famous mafia figure known as İnci Baba. In addition, she said that she did not know whether the 100 million that Baykal had asked her was a solicitor's fee or that it would be used to distribute bribes to various people to lift the stage ban.

Following this press statement, Deniz Baykal filed a lawsuit against Bülent Ersoy for the violation of his personal rights due to implications of both bribery and mafia involvement allegations. At the end of the case, the court fined Ersoy, but when Ersoy objected to the decision, the case was moved to the Court of Cassation. On 25 March 2008, the Court of Cassation upheld the decision of the local court and ordered Bülent Ersoy to pay 15,000 along with its interest to Baykal for causing non-pecuniary damages.

The case opened for her views on military service
Ersoy sparked controversy in February 2008 when she publicly criticised Turkey's incursion into northern Iraq and said she "would not send her sons to war" if she were a mother. An Istanbul public prosecutor subsequently filed charges against her for "turning Turks against compulsory military service", an issue which had also brought prominent Turkish intellectual Perihan Mağden to trial in the past. The Turkish Human Right Foundation (IHD) stood up to Ersoy's defence. On 19 December 2008, Ersoy was pronounced not guilty of charges by a Turkish court.

Discography
Albums

 1973: Ah Tut-i Mucize Guyem
 1975: Şöhretler
 1975: Konser 1
 1976: Toprak Alsın Muradımı
 1976: Bir Tanrıyı Bir de Beni
 1976: Konser 2
 1977: Konser 3
 1978: Orkide 1
 1978: Ölmeyen Şarkılar (eternal songs)
 1979: Orkide 2
 1979: Meyhaneci (the innkeeper)
 1980: Beddua
 1981: Mahşeri Yaşıyorum
 1981: Yüz Karası
 1983: Ak Güvercin (white dove)
 1983: Ne Duamsın Ne De Bedduam (you are neither in my prayers nor in my curses)
 1984: Düşkünüm Sana
 1985: Yaşamak İstiyorum
 1986: Anılardan Bir Demet
 1987: Suskun Dünyam
 1988: Biz Ayrılamayız
 1989: Avustralya Konseri
 1989: İstiyorum
 1989: Seçmeler
 1989: Bizim Hikayemiz
 1990: Öptüm
 1991: Bir Sen Bir de Ben
 1992: Ablan Kurban Olsun Sana
 1993: Türk Sanat Müziği Konseri 1
 1993: Türk Sanat Müziği Konseri 2
 1993: Türk Sanat Müziği Konseri 3
 1993: Türk Sanat Müziği Konseri 4
 1993: Şiirlerle Şarkılarla
 1993: Sefam Olsun
 1994: Akıllı Ol
 1995: Alaturka 1995
 1995: Benim Dünya Güzellerim
 1997: Maazallah
 2000: Alaturka 2000
 2002: Canımsın
 2011: Aşktan Sabıkalı
 2018: Alaturka
2021: Okenem askim ve alaturka 2021 
Singles
 "Dolmamış Çilem" (1980)
 "Ümit Hırsızı" (2019)

Filmography

Film
 Sıralardaki Heyecan (1976)
 Ölmeyen Şarkı (1977)
 İşte Bizim Hikayemiz (1978)
 Beddua (1980)
 Söhretin Sonu (1981)
 Acı Ekmek (1984)
 Asrın Kadını (1985)
 Tövbekar Kadın (1985)
 Benim Gibi Sev (1985)
 Efkarlıyım Abiler (1986)
 Yaşamak İstiyorum 1 (1986)
 Yaşamak İstiyorum 2 (1986)
 Kara Günlerim (1987)
 Biz Ayrılamayız (1988)
 Anılar (1989)
 İstiyorum (1989)

Television
 Bülent Ersoy Show (1995–1996; 2013–2014) – Presenter
 Bülent Ersoy'la Hatırla Bakalım (2005) – Presenter
 Popstar Alaturka (2007–2009) – Judge
 Beyaz Show (2012) – Guest
 Arkadaşım Hoşgeldin (2015) – Guest appearance
 Bu Tarz Benim (2015) – Guest judge
 Var Mısınız Yok Musunuz (2016) – Contestant
 Dünya Güzellerim (2017) – Herself
 Çukur (2017) – Guest appearance
 Popstar 2018 (2018) – Judge
 Kuaförüm Sensin (2020) – Judge
 Benzemez Kimse Bize (2021) – Presenter

See also
List of Turkish musicians
Music of Turkey

References

External links

 
 Bülent Ersoy  on SinemaTürk

1952 births
Living people
LGBT classical musicians
Turkish LGBT singers
Musicians from Istanbul
Transgender actresses
Transgender women musicians
Turkish women singers
Turkish classical singers
Turkish Muslims
Golden Butterfly Award winners
Transgender Muslims
21st-century LGBT people
Transgender singers